Godredsson is a surname. Notable people with the surname include:

Fingal Godredsson (died 1070), late 11th-century ruler of the Kingdom of the Isles
Harald Godredsson, mid-13th-century King of the Isles
Lagman Godredsson
Lagmann mac Gofraid (fl. early eleventh century), King of the Isles
Lǫgmaðr Guðrøðarson (fl. late eleventh century), King of the Isles
Olaf I Godredsson, 12th-century ruler of the Isle of Man and the Hebrides
Olaf II Godredsson, mid-13th-century sea-king who ruled the Isle of Man (Mann) and parts of the Hebrides
Ragnvald Godredsson (died 1229), ruled as King of the Isles from 1187 to 1226